People-watching or crowd watching is the act of observing people and their interactions as a subconscious doing. It involves picking up on idiosyncrasies to try to interpret or guess at another person's story, interactions, and relationships with the limited details they have. This includes speech in action, relationship interactions, body language, expressions, clothing and activities. Eavesdropping may accompany the activity, though is not required. 

For some people, it is considered a hobby, but for many others, it is a subconscious activity they partake in every day without even realizing it. People-watching is not to be confused with naturalistic observation. Naturalistic observation is used for scientific purposes, whereas people-watching is a casual activity, used for relaxation or inspiration for characters or characters' mannerisms in their own creative works. It should also not be confused with street photography; while the street photographer necessarily does people-watching, they do so for the purpose of taking photographs of the people for art and documentary purposes.

See also 
 Flâneur
 Street photography 
 Car spotting
 Train spotting
 Video surveillance
 Voyeurism

References

Anthropology
Observation hobbies
Crowds